The Marriage of Phaedra is a short story by Willa Cather. It was first published in The Troll Garden in 1905

Plot introduction
MacMaster visits a late painter's studio and attempts to collect information to write his biography.

Explanation of the title
'The Marriage of Phaedra' is an unfinished painting by Hugh Treffinger.

Plot summary
MacMaster goes to Hugh Treffinger's studio in Holland Road, London. He is greeted by James, who shows him around. Later, he visits Lady Mary Percy, whom he had met in Nice four years back. She criticises Hugh for his lack of manners and for his pride.  MacMaster takes to going to the studio to garner information from James. He meets Ellen Treffinger to tell her of his project of a biography. Later, he grows wary of an arts dealer, Lichtenstein. One day, James shows him an issue of The Times saying Ellen is engaged to get married, and she has sold 'The Marriage of Phaedra' to the arts dealer. However, James has stolen the painting as Hugh had made it clear to him before his death that he did not want it sold. MacMaster conjectures they have to tell Ellen of the situation. When he visits her the next day, she says the painting will have to go.

Characters
MacMaster, the protagonist. He sets out to write a biography of Hugh Treffinger.
Hugh Treffinger, a painter.
James, Hugh Treffinger's valet.
Lady Mary Percy, Ellen Treffinger's only sister.
Lady Ellen Treffinger, Hugh Treffinger's widow.
Ghillini, a friend of Hugh's.
Lichtenstein, a Jewish arts dealer from Melbourne, Australia.
Captain Alexander Gresham, Ellen Treffinger's new husband.

Allusions to other works
Hugh is said to have sought inspiration from Roman de la Rose, Boccaccio, and Amadis
The painting itself mentions Phaedra, who marries Theseus, and then fall for her stepson Hippolytus.

Allusions to actual history
Charlemagne and Blanche of Castile are mentioned with regards to Hugh's paintings.

Literary significance and criticism
The story may be inspired by Cather's 1902 visit of Edward Burne-Jones's studio in Kensington; she used the real name, James, of Burne-Jones's valet.

Further, the story has been deemed Jamesian for its narrative technique and its use of the painting as a means to convey meaning.

References

External links
Full text at the Willa Cather Archive

1905 short stories
Short stories by Willa Cather